The Military ranks of the Hungarian People's Army were the military insignia used by the Hungarian People's Army. The ranks replaced the Military ranks of the Kingdom of Hungary in 1945, following the abolition of the monarchy. The ranks were replaced by the Military ranks of Hungary, following the end of socialism in Hungary.

Commissioned officer ranks
The rank insignia of commissioned officers.

Other ranks
The rank insignia of non-commissioned officers and enlisted personnel.

References
Citations

Sources

External links
 

Hungary
Military of Hungary